The North Texas Mean Green men's basketball team represents the University of North Texas (UNT) in NCAA Division I college basketball, competing as a member of Conference USA.

For most of its history, the Mean Green have had patches of success, starting in the 1970s when the team received its first ever top-20 ranking under head coach Bill Blakeley as well as success in the late 1980s and early 1990s under head coach Jimmy Gales and then again in the mid to late 2000s under head coach Johnny Jones. Blakeley coached three consecutive 20-win seasons: 1975–76 (22-4); 1976–77 (21-6); 1977–78 (22-6).  North Texas has appeared in the NCAA tournament on four occasions: 1988, 2007, 2010, and 2021, recording their first-ever tournament win in 2021. The Mean Green went on an especially strong run in the 2006–2010 era, with two tournament appearances, two conference championships, and posting more wins over this time period than any other Division I team in the state of Texas.

The 2011–12 and 2012–13 teams featured the only 5-star recruit to play for North Texas in Tony Mitchell. In one season, he became the program's all-time leader in blocks. Despite Mitchell being highly touted, his performance in his second year suffered and he ended up struggling under new head coach Tony Benford eventually falling to the 2nd round of the NBA draft.

On April 16, 2012, longtime head coach Johnny Jones was formally introduced as the next head coach of his alma mater LSU. His replacement, Tony Benford, was not able to capitalize on the program's momentum, resulting in a disappointing final year in the Sun Belt Conference and then more struggles in the Mean Green's new conference Conference USA.

Prior to 1973, the Mean Green played in the Ken Bahnsen Gym, nicknamed the Snake Pit. They now play in The Super Pit which derives its name from the Snake Pit.

Championships

Conference tournament
Southland Conference
1988
Sun Belt Conference
2007, 2010
Conference USA
2021

Conference regular season
Sun Belt Conference
2009-10

Conference USA
2019-20

Conference division
Sun Belt Conference (West Division)
2009-10

Conference USA (West Division)
2021-22

CBI Tournament
2017-18

Rivals

The Mean Green's major rivals within Conference USA include the Middle Tennessee Blue Raiders and the UTSA Roadrunners.

Non-conference notable rivals include the University of Texas at Arlington Mavericks (games between the schools are well-attended due to geographic proximity and both schools being large universities) and the SMU Mustangs.

Coaches

Postseason results

NCAA tournament results
The Mean Green have appeared in the NCAA tournament four times. Their combined record is 1–4.

NIT results
The Mean Green have appeared in two National Invitation Tournament (NIT). Their combined record is 2–1.

CBI results
The Mean Green have appeared in the College Basketball Invitational (CBI) once, winning it in 2018. Their record is 5–1.

NAIA Tournament results
The Mean Green have appeared in the NAIA Tournament two times. Their record is 3–2.

Broadcasts
North Texas games are broadcast on the radio by the Mean Green Sports Network, part of Learfield IMG College on 88.1 KNTU and 95.3 KHYI. Former Texas Rangers and Dallas Mavericks announcer Dave Barnett does play by play, along with Hank Dickenson on color commentary.

Television broadcasts are carried by ESPN+, ESPN3, and C-USA TV.

Professional players
Jeremy Combs (born 1995), basketball player for Israeli team Hapoel Ramat Gan Givatayim
Chris Jones (born 1993), basketball player for Maccabi Tel Aviv of the Israeli Basketball Premier League

References

External links